Great Wheal Charlotte, also known as Wheal Charlotte, is an abandoned copper and tin mine near St Agnes in Cornwall, England. All that is left of the mine now is the wall and door arch of the engine house and an adjacent fenced-off mine shaft.

Great Wheal Charlotte opened in 1806. It was originally called North Towan. After operating profitably for a period, it was renamed Wheal Towan; however, the mine closed shortly afterwards. It opened again in the late 1820s, and was renamed New Charlotte and after that Great Wheal Charlotte. In 1877 it was renamed Charlotte United.

The engine house held a 60-inch pump and was built in 1828. It would have also contained two boilers and would have had a chimney.

The main shaft at Great Wheal Charlotte is engine shaft which is 82 fathoms and is located next to the remnant of the engine house. Other shafts can be seen in the surrounding area of the mine.

Great Wheal Charlotte is on the South West Coast Path and was purchased by the National Trust in 1956.

References

Tin mines in Cornwall
Copper mines in Cornwall
National Trust properties in Cornwall
Industrial buildings completed in 1828